Joan Maling is an American linguist and a former program director at the National Science Foundation. Her primary research expertise is in the syntax of Icelandic. Her mother was Harriet Florence Maling.

Maling earned a BA from Goucher College and a PhD in linguistics from the Massachusetts Institute of Technology (1973). She taught at Brandeis University from 1972 until she joined the National Science Foundation in 2003. She is professor emerita at Brandeis University.

Maling was a founding co-editor (1983–1986) and then editor-in-chief (1987–2003) of the linguistics journal Natural Language and Linguistic Theory.  She is a past president of the Linguistic Society of America (2014).

Maling retired from the National Science Foundation in 2021.

References

External links
 Profile at Brandeis University with links to publications up to 2005

Living people
Linguists from the United States
Brandeis University faculty
MIT School of Humanities, Arts, and Social Sciences alumni
Goucher College alumni
Linguistic Society of America presidents
Women linguists
1946 births
Fellows of the Linguistic Society of America